Bane Jelić born 1967, is a Serbian rock musician, painter, and writer.

Early life 

Bane Jelic was born in Belgrade, Serbia. From an early age he was attracted to musical instruments and music. At the age of ten he started to play the acoustic guitar, and for his twelfth birthday he received an electrical guitar and an amplifier. According to his own words, he spent many hours practicing his guitar skills. Most of the time he practiced, on average, ten hours every day.

Music career 

When Bane was only 12 years old, he created his first musical band, The Flying Cans, with his friends. The band played both Yugoslav and foreign songs. Next year, in 1980, he joined a heavy metal band Apocalypse, and performed in 1981 alongside much older musicians at a large venue in Belgrade's Tašmajdan pool. The master of ceremonies was the famous Vladimir Janković Džet. The concert was broadcast live by the radio station "Beograd 202". During this event the fourteen years old Bane gave his first interview from the stage.

Bane started his professional career with Magično oko band in 1984. The band had several tours across Yugoslavia, made a number of concerts and appearances on radio and TV, and was featured in many magazine articles and commercials. When Yugoslavia took part in Live Aid in 1985, organizing a venue on Belgrade's Red Star soccer club stadium, Magično oko opened the concert.

In 1987 Bane went to serve the mandatory military service. He soon becomes the leader of a military band and in this capacity spends the entire service time playing with the band in a military centre (Dom JNA).

Later Bane joined Peđa The Boys Band, and composed most of the music, and wrote most of the lyrics for their third album in 1987.

In 1989, Bane joined Viktorija band, and spent the next three and a half years playing with them, composing the music and the lyrics for some of their most successful hits – "Rat i mir" and "Od Splita do Beograda". At that time, Viktorija was one of the most famous and most popular bands in Yugoslavia.

In 1993, alongside Milan and Vladan Đurđević, and Čeda Macura Bane founded Neverne Bebe. During that period, Neverne bebe recorded an album for Take it or Leave it Records. As he likes to say, this was the best band he ever played in, and one of the best periods in his life.

At the same time, Bane started working on an instrumental album called Universe, that was published by PGP-RTS as a limited edition, only in 2002.

In 1999, Bane joined Osvajači (The Conquerors), where he participated in two of the band's albums, and performed throughout Serbia and Montenegro and Europe.

Since 2002 Bane is endorsed Ibanez guitars.

In 2003 Bane enters the studio once again and creates a new instrumental album East-West. Music is arranged, produced, mixed and mastered by Bane Jelic. This album was published in 2015.

In 2004 Bane released the album called "The Ultra Extreme". This material was in the making from 1984 till 1994, and was recorded on a standard tape recorder at home, from the first hand without repetition or overplay. This material is interesting because it shows how he played at different points in time, from the age of sixteen onwards. The album includes cover versions of Niccolo Paganini’s 5th, 11th and 16th caprices, Moto Perpetuo, as well as Rimsky-Korsakov’s "Flight of the Bumblebee". Bane also composed his own two caprices – "La ruota della vita", which was played in staccato technique and "La fuga del salmone" in arpegio technique. Bane plays also Joe Satriani's caprice "Power Cosmic" but in a much faster technique than the original one. Bane expresses through his improvisations different solo playing technique in an amazingly fast tempo that explains the name of this album. The ultra extreme refers to the extremely fast, yet clear playing technique.

During his Real Illusions Tour in 2005, Steve Vai performed in Belgrade's SKC and invited Bane Jelić to be a guest artist. They had a jam session on the song "My Guitar Wants to Kill Your Mama".See on youtube.

In 2007, Bane published his progressive pop-rock album Srce zmaja (Dragon's heart), writing the music and lyrics, and performing both the instrumental and vocal sections on the album.

Between April and June 2007 Bane was engaged in a project for Evolucija, a Serbian and Swiss gothic metal band, creating all music, lyrics, arrangements as well as producing, mastering, mixing and playing guitars. This album was released by Take it or Leave it Records.

Currently, Bane again performs with Osvajači and they have a new album in production. The band is actively performing around Serbia and neighbouring countries. In December 2015 they published their 7-th album Sad je na mene red (Now it's my turn) for Pop Music Records.

Also, in November 2015 Bane Jelic published his new instrumental album East-West for Take It Or Leave It Records
2015. Collaboration with the video group Tijan song Light at the end of the tunnel.

2017 album Put do srca  Take It Or Leave It Records.
2019. Collaboration on the video of the group Chetvorka (Igor Vukojević) silk songs.
2020. makes music and lyrics for the group Twins, songs: Blue Elephant 2, Bomb and Nirvana and the song Extra for Grand Production.

2020. collaboration with Nick Z. Marino singer and keyboardist of legendary guitarist Yngwie Malmsteen

Triple art 
He is a professional painter. He presented the first exhibition of paintings entitled "Waves" in Belgrade at the Pedagogical Museum in 2019, then in Paracin - cultural center, in Batocina - cultural center, in Vrsac - cultural center, at the Prot Fest in Bijeljina in the gallery of the cultural center at the collective exhibition in 2019, in Belgrade at the Pedagogical Museum in 2020. entitled "Golden Age" (the exhibition was opened by Maja Živanović, art critic and journalist) at Ummus in Kragujevac at the collective exhibition in 2020. and in Novi Sad at the Cultural Center. Many of his works are in private collections in Serbia, Montenegro, Bosnia and Herzegovina, Sweden, Italy, Germany.

In addition to music and painting, Bane is a great lover of literature, and spends part of his time writing. He published works in the literary collection "Arte stih" (3 and 4) in Belgrade in 2015 and 2016 and in the magazine "Svetosavsko ognjište" (2016 and 2017, Johannesburg). For the publishing house Logos, he is publishing his first book in a surrealistic form called "The Mirror of Fire" in 2017. The promotion of the book was also held at the Prot Fest in Bijeljina in 2019. He also promoted at the book fair at the Logos stand.

Discography

Solo albums 
Put do srca (1997) (Bane Jelić Band)
Universe (2002), PGP-RTS
The Ultra Extreme (2004), Performance Records
Srce zmaja (2007), Mascom Records
East-West (2015), Take It Or Leave It Records
Put do srca (2017), Take It Or Leave It Records

With Osvajači 
Vino crveno (1999), Grand Production
Nevera (2000), Grand Production
Crno oko (2002), City Records
Sad je na mene red (2015), Pop Music Records – Grand Production

References

External links 
 

1967 births
Living people
Musicians from Belgrade
Serbian musicians
Serbian rock guitarists
Serbian heavy metal musicians
Serbian rock musicians